The Draytones were an Anglo-Argentine music group formed in London, England in 2006. The same year they signed a record deal with 1965 Records, an independent record label based in London.

History
The Draytones were formed by Argentine guitarist Gabriel Boccazzi (from Buenos Aires) and drummer Luke Richardson (from Grimsby) in Camden, London in 2006. The pair were introduced by the owner of the famous Bethnal Green live music venue The Pleasure Unit, Nigerian Nick 'The Kick'. They wrote a handful of songs in Boccazzi's flat in Camden before meeting bassist Chris Le Good (from Twickenham). They rehearsed as a three piece and played their first show at the 'Skrimshankers' night at 93 Feet East, Brick Lane, London supporting Luke's friend's band The Hoosiers (then called The Hoosier Complex).

1965 records
Having played only two shows, the band were contacted through their Myspace page by 1965 Records with regards to the band playing a show at 'The Windmill of Your Mind' night at The Windmill, Brixton with 1965 Records first signing, The View. It was at this, their third show, that The Draytones were offered a record deal with 1965 Records.
It was on this same night that they met Stan Kybert (Oasis, Paul Weller, Massive Attack) who later became the band's producer.

Debut EP
In September 2006, the band went into The Dairy Studios, Brixton to record and mix their debut EP "Forever On" in 7 days with producer Stan Kybert.

They recorded seven songs, six of which comprised the EP "Forever On" and one b-side. Their debut single, "Keep Loving Me", was released in 2007 – followed by the EP.

The song "Keep Loving Me" was used on a Mojo Magazine covermount entitled "Best of British 2007", and as the backing music for the Official Formula One websites video highlight of the 2008 Monaco Grand Prix. The music Video for Keep Loving Me Was directed by Dan Knight. 

Keep Loving Me also featured in the UK TV drama series Skins and it's the original soundtrack to the acclaimed video game Shaun White Snowboarding.
The Song "Time" was used on NME magazine "Independent Thinking −1965 Records"

2007
The Draytones toured the UK extensively in 2007, including a Thursday night headline slot at Glastonbury Festival, RockNess, Dot To Dot festival, Lounge on the Farm festival and Summer Sonic festival, Tokyo/Osaka (Japan).
In August they returned to the recording studio with Stan Kybert to record their debut LP Up in My Head. This time they chose Chapel Studios, Lincolnshire (only a few miles from drummer Luke Richardson's birthplace) and recorded 15 songs in 16 days. The album was mixed at the newly opened Dean Street Studios, Soho, London (formerly the studio of Tony Visconti) in 5 days.

2008
2008 began with the band recruiting Alex Gazettas (formerly of Steve Lamacq favourites White Man Kamikaze) to play keyboards. Following this they embarked on a bi-weekly residency at the 12 Barclub, Tin Pan Alley, London.

The Draytones were then personally invited to support Paul Weller on his UK tour in May after he heard the Up in My Head LP.

They played dates across the UK including Blackpool Empress Ballroom and Hammersmith Apollo, London. They were filmed throughout the tour by a TV crew from Argentina, filming a 13-part documentary for South American network television (to be aired late 2008)

The song "Don't Talk to Me" was used on the Clash Magazine covermount CD in April 2008. The single "Turn it Down" was released in April 2008. The album Up in My Head was released 5 May 2008.

2009
In 2009, they visited a few countries performing, now with Andy Pickering playing the keyboards/guitars and vocals.

And from October to December, they completed the Friendship Tour South America- taking in Buenos Aires, provincial Argentina and a week in the Falkland Islands- becoming the first Anglo-Argentine band ever to do so, resulting in major network news coverage of the story in Argentina and worldwide.

2010
The Draytones sign to My Major Company UK a Fan-funded music label which launched in the United Kingdom in October 2010. The band are one of the first ten artists in the labels launch roster. Also this years saw them return to Buenos Aires for a handful of shows.

2011
The Draytones form their own label 'Forever on Records'

2012
The Draytones release a single "This will always hurt", the band's first since 2008 followed by Today's Memories, produced by Stan Kybert and recorded in the legendary Sawmills Studio in Cornwall. 
The album is a celebration of all the band have achieved since their last release; playing festivals and major support slots whilst touring Europe, UK and Argentina three times, including being the first Anglo-Argentine group to tour The Falkland Islands. Staying true to their achievements and musical roots, Today's Memories is a six-track EP self-released through the band's record label 'Forever on Records'.

2013
By the end of 2012 two of the founder members of the band Le Good and Richardson leave the band and Steve Dawson (drums) and Pablo Scopinaro (bass) joined the band.

2015
The band plays their last show at the Roxy Live in Buenos Aires, Argentina on 22 December 2015, giving an end to their 10 year long career.

Discography
Forever On (2007) (EP)
Up in My Head (2008) (LP)
Today's Memories (2012) (EP)
See What You Hear (2015) (EP)

References

External links
 The Draytones Official store
 this will always hurt
 keep loving me keep loving me
 Official site

Musical groups established in 2006
English indie rock groups